David C. DiCarlo (born September 21, 1945) is a former Democratic member of the Pennsylvania House of Representatives.

References

1945 births
Living people
Politicians from Erie, Pennsylvania
Democratic Party members of the Pennsylvania House of Representatives